Wolff is a surname.

Wolff may also refer to:
Wolff, Indiana
Rudolf Wolff & Co., commodity broker
Nelson W. Wolff Municipal Stadium